Herminia tarsicrinalis, the shaded fan-foot, is a litter moth of the family Erebidae. The species was first described by August Wilhelm Knoch in 1782. It can be found in Europe.

The moths flies from June to July depending on the location.

The larvae feed on withered leaves.

References

External links

"08845 Herminia tarsicrinalis (Knoch, 1782) - Braungestreifte Spannereule". Lepiforum e.V. Retrieved 27 January 2020.

Herminiinae
Moths of Asia
Moths of Japan
Moths of Europe
Taxa named by August Wilhelm Knoch
Moths described in 1782